Yevgeni Gennadyevich Smertin (born 17 January 1969) is a former Russian professional footballer and a current football coach.

Club career
He made his debut in the Soviet Top League in 1988 for FC Dynamo Moscow.

Personal life
He is the older brother of Alexei Smertin.

Honours
 Russian Premier League runner-up: 1994.
 Russian Premier League bronze: 1992, 1993.
 Soviet Top League bronze: 1990.

European club competitions
 UEFA Cup 1991–92 with FC Dynamo Moscow: 5 games.
 UEFA Cup 1992–93 with FC Dynamo Moscow: 5 games.
 UEFA Cup 1993–94 with FC Dynamo Moscow: 2 games.
 UEFA Cup 1996–97 with FC Torpedo-Luzhniki Moscow: 2 games.

References

1969 births
Living people
Sportspeople from Barnaul
Soviet footballers
Russian footballers
Association football midfielders
Association football defenders
Soviet Union under-21 international footballers
Russian football managers
FC Dynamo Barnaul players
FC Dynamo Moscow players
FC Lokomotiv Nizhny Novgorod players
FC Torpedo Moscow players
FC Torpedo-2 players
FC Shinnik Yaroslavl players
FC Saturn Ramenskoye players
Russian Premier League players
Soviet Top League players